Lo no dicho, (The unspoken in English) is the fifth book of the Uruguayan Horacio López Usera. Published in 2013.

Review 
It is a book that deals with addictions, to drugs, sex, gambling, screen, work, food, among others.

Horacio López was formed as "operador terapéutico" in addiction. The book was presented 11 April 11, in House of the Seven Winds, in Montevideo.

References 

2013 non-fiction books
Uruguayan books
Spanish-language books